Leptoconchus striatus is a species of sea snail, a marine gastropod mollusk in the family Muricidae, the murex snails or rock snails.

Description
The shell size varies between 20 mm and 80 mm.

Distribution
This species is distributed in the Red Sea, in the Indian Ocean along East Africa, in the Indo-West Pacific and along North Queensland, Australia.

References

 Fishelson, L., 1971. Ecology and distribution of the benthic fauna in the shallow waters of the Red Sea. Mar. Biol., Berl. 10 2: 113–133

External links
 Gastropods.com : Magilus striatus; accessed : 12 March 2011

Leptoconchus
Gastropods described in 1835